{{Infobox settlement
|official_name          = Municipality of Marituba
|other_name             = 
|native_name            = Marituba 
|nickname               = 
|settlement_type        = Municipality
|motto                  =

|image_skyline          = 
|imagesize              = 
|image_caption          = 
|image_flag             = Flag_of_Marituba.svg
|flag_size              =
|image_seal             = 
|seal_size              =
|image_map              = Para Municip Marituba.svg
|mapsize                = 250px
|map_caption            = Location in Pará and Brazil
|pushpin_map            = Brazil
|pushpin_label_position = bottom
|pushpin_map_caption    = Location in Brazil
|subdivision_type       = Country
|subdivision_name       = 
|subdivision_type1      = Region 
|subdivision_name1      = Northern
|subdivision_type2      = State
|subdivision_name2      = Pará
|subdivision_type3      = Mesoregion
|subdivision_name3      = Metropolitana de Belém
|government_footnotes   =
|government_type        =
|leader_title           = Mayor
|leader_name            = Patrícia Mendes (Republicans (Brazil))
|established_title      = Founded
|established_date       = September 22, 1994
|area_magnitude         = 
|unit_pref                = Imperial 
|area_total_km2           = 103.343
|area_footnotes           = 
|area_land_km2            = 
|population_as_of               = 2020 
|population_footnotes           = 
|population_note                = 
|population_total               = 133,685
|population_density_km2         = auto
|timezone               = BRT
|utc_offset             = −3
|timezone_DST           = 
|utc_offset_DST         = 
|coordinates            = 
|elevation_footnotes    = 
|elevation_m            = 
|elevation_ft           = 

|postal_code_type       =  
|postal_code            =
|area_code              =
|blank_name             = ''HDI (2000)
|blank_info             = 0.717 – medium
|website                = Official website
|footnotes              = 
}}Marituba''' is a municipality in the state of Pará in the Northern region of Brazil. It is the smallest municipality of Pará and the smallest in all Northern Brazil.

See also
List of municipalities in Pará

References

Municipalities in Pará